Broderipia iridescens is a species of sea snail, a marine gastropod mollusk in the family Trochidae, the top snails.

Description
The size of the shell varies between 8 mm and 10 mm.
The shell is limpet-shaped, with oval outline and posterior apex. The margins are expanded. In profile it is very depressed, highest a little back of the
middle, the slope from the apex upward short and concave, from the apex downward gently convex. The surface is lusterless, with scarcely visible growth striae. The shell is opaque-white, radiately striped with olive-bordered red lines, generally interrupted and forming a tessellated white and dark pattern. The apex is minute, recumbent, spiral, dextral. The inside of the shell is brilliantly iridescent, not showing the color pattern clearly except at the red-and-white spotted margins.

Distribution
This species occurs in the Pacific Ocean and in the Indian Ocean off Réunion.

References

External links
 To Barcode of Life (1 barcode)
 To Biodiversity Heritage Library (19 publications)
 To GenBank (7 nucleotides; 2 proteins)
 To World Register of Marine Species
 

iridescens
Gastropods described in 1834